Kadira Divyaraja is an upcoming Sri Lankan Sinhala language fantasy film written and directed by professor Sunil Ariyaratne. This mythological film depicts the romantic relationship between Hindu god Kartikeya and the aboriginal princess Valli.

The film stars Indian actors Sonakshi Rawat as Valli and Samar Vermani as Kartikeya in the lead roles. Supporting actors include Roshan Pilapitiya, Nilmini Tennakoon, Jagath Chamila, Wasantha Wittachchi, Dhananjaya Siriwardhana and Vinu Udani. This is directed by Sunil Ariyaratne.

The filming of the movie took place at Ranmihithenna Telecinema Park, Sri Lanka.

Cast
 Samar Vermani as Kartikeya
 Sonakshi Rawat as Valli
 Roshan Pilapitiya
 Nilmini Tennakoon
 Wasantha Wittachchi
 Jagath Chamila
 Vinu Udani Siriwardhana
 Charith Abeysinghe
 Dhananjaya Siriwardena
 Sampath Tennakoon
 Sarath Kothalawala
 Wasantha Kumaravila

References

Upcoming films
Sinhala-language films
Sri Lankan drama films